Patrícia Ribeiro Faro (born 1972) is a Portuguese psychologist and politician. As a member of the Portuguese Socialist Party (PS), she was elected as a deputy in the Portuguese Assembly of the Republic in January 2022, representing the Porto District.

Early life and education
Patrícia Ribeiro Faro was born in 1972 in Matosinhos, a coastal city to the northwest of Porto in Portugal. She graduated in social work in 1996 from the Instituto Superior de Serviço Social do Porto (ISSSP) in the area of justice and social reintegration. In 2003 she completed post-graduate studies on legal problems and drug addiction. In December 2012, she obtained a master's degree in legal psychology from the Fernando Pessoa University with a dissertation on Representations of victims of domestic violence in the criminal justice system. In 2014 she received qualifications in victim support. She has been studying for a PhD in sociology at the Faculty of Arts of the University of Porto.

Career
Since 2005, Faro has been the technical director of the Portuguese Red Cross shelter in Matosinhos for women and children who are victims of domestic violence and president of the Matosinhos Red Cross since 2008. She participated in the design and development of an Emergency Shelter House intended for the temporary reception of female victims of domestic violence, and their children. Since 2014, she has been vice-president of the Porto Red Cross. In April 2021 she was appointed as a specialist government advisor to the Office of the Secretary of State for Citizenship and Equality.

Political life
Faro became a deputy in the Porto municipal assembly in 2017. In July 2020 she was elected president of Porto Socialist Women – Equality and Rights (MS-ID) for the 2020–2022 term. In the January 2022 Portuguese legislative election she was elected to the National Assembly, being 15th on the Socialist Party's list for the Porto District constituency. The PS won 19 seats in Porto and an overall majority in the country.

References

1972 births
Living people
People from Matosinhos
Socialist Party (Portugal) politicians
Members of the Assembly of the Republic (Portugal)
Women members of the Assembly of the Republic (Portugal)
Portuguese psychologists
Fernando Pessoa University alumni